This is a list of hospitals in Greece.  The list contains links to notable hospitals in Greece.  As of 2005, there were 327 hospitals in Greece, including public and private hospitals. The number of hospitals declined to 283 by 2017.

Hospitals 

The active Greek hospitals are listed in this table, along with their location, number of staffed beds, the year they opened and references.  The Greek word agios (saint) is commonly used in names of hospitals.  The oldest active hospital is the Elpis Hospital in Athens, founded in 1842.

Notes

Gallery

See also

In ancient Greece, temples dedicated to the healer-god Asclepius, known as Asclepeion functioned as centres of medical advice, prognosis, and healing.
 Ancient Greek medicine
 Byzantine medicine

References

General references:

 </ref>
 Risse, Guenter B. Mending Bodies, Saving Souls: A History of Hospitals (1999); world coverage
 Νοσοκομεία ανά Υγειονομική Περιφέρεια

 List
Hospitals
Greece
Greece